Liang Jingkang (born 4 January 1994), also known as Leon Leong, formerly  Connor Leong, is a Chinese actor and model. He is best known for his role as Feng Meizuo in the television series Meteor Garden (2018), which propelled him to fame in China and Asia.

Early life and education
Leong was born on 4 January 1994 in Shenzhen, Guangdong province of China. He attended South China Institute of Software Engineering in Guangzhou University. In college, he began modelling and filming advertisements.

Career

2016–2017: Beginnings
In 2016, Leong debuted as an actor in the historical comedy series Huang Fei Hong where he played the role as Gong Ting. He then starred in the short film Night Poet.
The same year, Leong was cast as a customer in the Chinese film adaptation of Midnight Diner directed by Tony Leung Ka-fai.

In 2017, Leong starred in the fantasy romance film Cat Lover. Leong also participated in the Youku variety show Super Idol, hosted by He Jiong. 
The same year, he was cast by Angie Chai in the role of Feng Meizuo in the 2018 adaptation of Meteor Garden  Leong appeared in Harper's Bazaar China with his Meteor Garden costars Dylan Wang, Darren Chen, and Caesar Wu in the November issue.

2018–present: Rising popularity
Leong rose to fame with his role as Feng Meizuo in the 2018 television series Meteor Garden, the remake of popular Taiwanese drama series Meteor Garden and based on the Japanese shōjo manga series  written by Yoko Kamio.

In 2019, Leong starred in Another Me, a television drama based on the film Soul Mate (2016). He plays a guest role as the younger brother of the female lead. The same year, he played the male lead in the youth sports drama Never Stand Still.

In 2020, Leong starred in the youth romance drama My Love, Enlighten Me. He is set to star in the youth comedy drama Run For Young. In November 2020, he was cast as the main lead of the upcoming C-drama, A Robot In the Orange Orchard, alongside Sun Qian.

Filmography

Film

Television series

Variety Shows

Discography

Awards and nominations

References
  Some of the content in this article was copied from Connor Leong at the Hana Yori Dango wiki, which is licensed under the Creative Commons Attribution-Share Alike 3.0 (Unported) (CC-BY-SA 3.0) license.

External links
 
 

Chinese male television actors
Chinese male film actors
21st-century Chinese male actors
1994 births
Living people
People from Shenzhen